Colour Revolt EP is the first release from the band Colour Revolt, released by Esperanza Plantation in 2005, then re-released by Tiny Evil in 2006. The EP was recorded by Steven Bevilaqua at The Train Station and at "Chaney and Leah's house." Mixing was done by Clay Jones at Pete's Room. Mastering by Rodney Mills' Masterhouse.

Track listing 

 "Blood in Your Mouth" – 5:44
 "Mattresses Underwater" – 5:01
 "A New Family" – 3:23
 "Our Homes Are Graves" – 2:25
 "Change Your Face or Change Your Name" – 5:12
 "Circus" – 4:00

Personnel
Band
Jimmy Cajoleas - guitar
Len Clark - drums, vocals
Jesse Coppenbarger - vocals, guitar, piano, organ, harmonica, vibraphone
Sean Kirkpatrick - guitar, vocals, piano
Drew Mellon - bass guitar, synthesizer

Artwork
Jonathon Blackwell - art direction, concept, layout, design.
Len Clark - art direction, concept
Jesse Coppenbarger - art direction, concept
Steven Bevilaqua - art direction, concept
Chaney Nichols - art direction, concept
Leah Nichols - art direction, concept

References 

2006 debut EPs
Colour Revolt albums